The 1980–81 Northern Premier League was the thirteenth season of the Northern Premier League, a regional football league in Northern England, the northern areas of the Midlands and North Wales. The season began on 16 August 1980 and concluded on 3 May 1981.

Overview
The League featured twenty-two clubs.

Team changes
The following club left the League at the end of the previous season:
Frickley Athletic promoted to Alliance Premier League

The following club joined the League at the start of the season:
King's Lynn transferred from Southern League Midland Division

League table

Results

Stadia and locations

Cup Results
Challenge Cup Cup:

Marine bt. Runcorn

Northern Premier League Shield:

Runcorn bt. Mossley

Cup results

Challenge Cup

Northern Premier League Shield

Between Champions of NPL Premier Division and Winners of the NPL Cup.
As Runcorn won both the Northern Premier League and the Challenge Cup, Mossley qualified as 2nd placed team of the NPL.

FA Cup

Only one of the twenty-two Northern Premier League clubs reached the second round:

Second Round

FA Trophy

One of the twenty-two Northern Premier League clubs reached the fourth round:

Fourth Round

End of the season
At the end of the thirteenth season of the Northern Premier League, Runcorn applied to join the Alliance Premier League and were successful.

Promotion and relegation
The following club left the League at the end of the season:
Runcorn promoted to Alliance Premier League

The following club joined the League the following season:
Bangor City relegated from Alliance Premier League (returning after a two year's absence)

References

External links
 Northern Premier League official website
 Northern Premier League tables at RSSSF
 Football Club History Database

Northern Premier League seasons
6